Abu Ja'far Ahmad ibn Nasr was a merchant and Isma'ili dāʿī. He operated openly as the head of the pro-Fatimid propaganda in Fustat, the capital of Egypt, during the last years of Ikhshidid rule, and played a major role in preparing the quick and relatively bloodless Fatimid conquest of Egypt in 969.

References

Sources
 
 

10th-century Arabs
10th-century people from the Fatimid Caliphate
Ismaili da'is
People of the Ikhshidid dynasty
10th-century merchants
10th-century Ismailis